Paing Phyo Thu (born 5 April 1990) is a Myanmar Academy Award winning Burmese film actress and a medical doctor. She won the Myanmar Academy Award for Best Supporting Actress in 2017 Myanmar Motion Picture Academy Awards with the film, 3Girls. Paing Phyo Thu is considered one of the promising and prominent actresses in Myanmar. She is known for her performances in Mi (2018), Now & Ever (2019) and What Happened to the Wolf? (2021).

Early life and education
Paing Phyo Thu was born on 5 April 1990 in Yangon, Myanmar. Her mother Nwe Oo, is a physician. She passed the matriculation from TTC Yangon in 2006. She graduated from the University of Medicine 1, Yangon. She served as Health Ambassador (Yangon Division) for Ministry of Health and Sports in 2018.

Career 
Paing Phyo Thu started her career as a child actor in 1999. Her performances as child actor stood out and she became an actress in Myanmar major films in later years. In 2017, she was cast to play a lead role in the film Mi which is based on the novel by one of the most prominent Myanmar novelists, Kyi Aye. Although expectations were high, the film was well received by the audience. The film release was followed by some criticism on her portrayal of character Mi who is a chain-smoker. She stood firmly of her portrayal of Mi by giving up her title of Health Ambassador (Yangon Division) for Ministry of Health and Sports.

She won the Best Actress Award for her performance in Mi (film) at Star Awards (2018). She was nominated (Best Actress) for her performance in Mi (film) at ASEAN International Film Festival and Awards (2019). In 2021, she was also nominated for Best Performance (Seymour Cassel Award) in What Happened to the Wolf? at Oldenburg International Film Festival (2021).

On 1 January 2019, she married Na Gyi, the Burmese film director who directed the film, Mi.

Political activities
Following the 2021 Myanmar coup d'état, Paing Phyo Thu was active in anti-coup movements both in person at rallies and through social media. Denouncing the military coup, she has taken part in protests since February. She joined the "We Want Justice" three-finger salute movement. The movement was launched on social media, and many celebrities have joined the movement.

On 2 April 2021, warrant for her arrest was issued under section 505 (a) of the Myanmar Penal Code by the State Administration Council for speaking out against the military coup, calling for participation in the Civil Disobedience Movement (CDM) and supporting the Committee Representing Pyidaungsu Hluttaw. Paing Phyo Thu and Na Gyi had to go into hiding ever since.

Filmography

Film (cinema)
Angel of Eden (2016)
Nay Win Ate Tan Tat (2017)
3Girls (2017)
Mi (2018)
Lay Par Kyawt Shein Warazain (2019)
Sponsor (2019)Now and Ever (2019)Bo Nay Toe (2019)Confession of a Woman (2020)Longing with Love (2020)Lady Danger (2020)What Happened to the Wolf? (2021)It's Not Over, We Still Have Our Turn (2023)

Television seriesBattle of 2 Flowers'' (2017)

Awards

References

External links
 
 

Living people
1990 births
21st-century Burmese physicians
Burmese women physicians
University of Medicine 1, Yangon alumni
21st-century Burmese actresses